Countess is the female equivalent of the title Count, or in Britain of the title Earl.

Countess or The Countess may also refer to:
 
Countess (cake)

Geography
Countess, Alberta, a community in Canada
Countess Hospital, in Chester, England

Arts
Countess (novel), a novel by Josephine Edgar
The Countess (play), 1999 play
The Countess (film), a 2009 film about Elizabeth Báthory
The Countess (American Horror Story), an American Horror Story: Hotel character
The Countess, Hrabina (opera), an opera by Stanisław Moniuszko
Countess (band), a black metal band

See also